Inácio Henrique de Gouveia was a Brazilian military leader.

He participated in a governing junta (also including Graciano dos Santos Neves and Galdino Teixeira de Barros Loreto, in control of the state of Espírito Santo from December 8, 1891, to May 3, 1892. In 1897, he took part in the assault on the rebellious community of Canudos, which was completely destroyed by the Brazilian army.

Governors of Espírito Santo
Year of death missing
Year of birth missing
19th-century Brazilian military personnel